The Guadiana River (also ,), or Odiana, is an international river defining a long stretch of the Portugal-Spain border, separating Extremadura and Andalusia (Spain) from Alentejo and Algarve (Portugal). The river's basin extends from the eastern portion of Extremadura to the southern provinces of the Algarve; the river and its tributaries flow from east to west, then south through Portugal to the border towns of Vila Real de Santo António (Portugal) and Ayamonte (Spain), where it flows into the Gulf of Cádiz.

Etymology

During the Moorish occupation and settlement, the name was extended and referred to as Wadi Ana (wādī being the Arab term for "river"), later passed on to Portuguese and Spanish settlers as the Ouadiana, and later just Odiana. Since the 16th century, due to Castilian influences, the name has slowly evolved to take on the form Guadiana, a cognitive variation that developed from many Moorish-Arab river place-names using the prefix guad- (such as the rivers Guadalquivir, Guadalete, Guadalajara or Guadarrama).

Watershed

The Guadiana flows east to west through Spain and south through Portugal, then forms the Spanish-Portuguese border; it flows into the Gulf of Cádiz, part of the Atlantic Ocean, between Vila Real de Santo António (Portugal) and Ayamonte (Spain). About 82 percent, of its basin is in Spain, while about 17 percent,  is in Portugal.

Sources

A classic theory introduced by Pliny the Elder, was that the river originated from the Lagunas de Ruidera and divided into two branches: the Upper Guadiana and the Guadiana, while separated by a subterranean course. This legend developed from a misguided belief (which persisted until the 19th century) that the river appeared and disappeared over time, because of its subterranean tributary. In fact, no subterranean course exists, and the belief that the Lagunas de Ruidera is the source is also controversial. toponymically and traditionally the Upper Guadiana, which runs from Viveros (Albacete) until Argamasilla de Alba (Ciudad Real) had been identified as the main branch of the Guadiana. But even hydro-geological characteristics indicate that the Upper Guadiana may not be the principal river within the system.

Another of the origin theories, postulated that the Cigüela and Záncara rivers were the sources of the Guadiana. Today, they are considered integral parts of the river's headwaters and important tributaries, but not necessarily the exact origin. The union of the rivers Ciguela and Záncara permits the replenishment of the waters in the Tablas de Daimiel National Park, a wetland that was designated for protection by the Spanish government in 1973 (situated in the municipalities of Villarrubia de los Ojos and Daimiel, in the province of Ciudad Real).

Course
From its origin/spring runs from the southern Iberian plain in a direction east to west, to near the town of Badajoz, where it begins to track south leading to the Gulf of Cádiz. The Guadiana marks the border of Spain and Portugal twice as it runs to the ocean: first, between the River Caia and Ribeira de Cuncos, then later from the River Chança until its mouth. The river is not used to completely mark the boundary between the two states; between the Olivenza ravine and the Táliga ravine, the border still remains a disputed section claimed de jure by both countries and administered de facto by Spain (as part of the Spanish autonomous community of Extremadura).

North of Mértola on the Guadiana is the highest waterfall is Southern Portugal called Pulo do Lobo.

The ecosystem has Mediterranean hydrological characteristics, including high variation in intra- and inter-annual discharge, large floods and severe droughts.

Estuary
The river empties into the Gulf of Cadiz between  Ayamonte and Vila Real de Santo António, the two highly touristic regions of the Algarve and the sea-side of Andalusia. There it forms a saltmarsh estuary.

Human impact
In Spain, three autonomous communities, (Castilla-La Mancha, Extremadura and Andalusia) (comprising the provinces of Ciudad Real, Badajoz, Huelva and to a small extent Albacete) are crossed by the Guadiana. Meanwhile, in Portugal the river crosses the regions of Alentejo and  Algarve, and the districts of Portalegre, Évora, Beja and Faro.

Dams
There are over 30 dams on the river basin. The following are the dams on the Guadiana river itself:
 Alqueva Dam, the largest dam, located near Moura, in the Beja District, responsible for the largest reservoir in Western Europe. (There are several larger ones in Russia and Ukraine.)
García Sola Reservoir
Cíjara Reservoir
El Vicario Reservoir
Orellana Reservoir

See also
 List of rivers of Spain
Tablas de Daimiel
Pulo do Lobo

References
Notes

Sources

External links
 Guadiana Online
 United Nations Environment Programme description

 
Rivers of Spain
Natura 2000 in Portugal